Safi-ad-din Ardabili ( Ṣāfī ad-Dīn Isḥāq Ardabīlī; 1252/3 – 1334) was a poet, mystic, teacher and Sufi master. He was the son-in-law and spiritual heir of the Sufi master Zahed Gilani, whose order—the Zahediyeh—he reformed and renamed the Safaviyya, which he led from 1301 to 1334.

Safi was the eponymous ancestor of the Safavid dynasty, which ruled Iran from 1501 to 1736.

Background
Safi was born in 1252/3 in the town of Ardabil, located in Azerbaijan—a region corresponding to the northwestern part of Iran—then under Mongol rule. The town—a commercial centre during this period—was situated in a mountainous area, near the Caspian Sea. Safi's father was Amin al-Din Jibrail, while his mother was named Dawlati. The family was of Kurdish origin, and spoke Persian as their primary language. The life of Safi's father is obscure; Ibn Bazzaz, whose report is distorted, states that Amin al-Din Jibrail died when Safi was six, while Hayati Tabrizi reports that he was born in 1216 and died in 1287.

Life
According to hagiographical chronicles, Safi was bound to eminence since his birth. As a child, he was taught in religion, and saw visions of angels and met the abdal and awtad. When he reached adulthood, he was unable to find a murshid (spiritual guide) that would appease him, and thus left for Shiraz at the age of 20, in 1271/2. There he was to meet Shaykh Najib al-Din Buzghush, but the latter died before Safi reached him. He then continued his search in the Caspian region, where he met Zahed Gilani at the village of Hilya Karin in 1276/7. There he became a disciple of the latter, and enjoyed close relations with him; Safi was married to Zahed's daughter Bibi Fatima, while Zahed's son Hajji Shams al-Din Muhammad was married to Safi's daughter. 

Safi and Bibi Fatima had three sons; Muhyi al-Din, Sadr al-Din Musa (who later succeeded him), and Abu Sa'id. Safi was appointed the next-in-line of the Zahediyeh order by Zahed, whom he succeeded in 1301 after the latters death. Safi's succession to the Zahediyeh was met with animosity by Zahedi's family and some of the latters followers. Safi renamed the order as the Safaviyya, and started implementing reforms to it, transforming it from a local Sufi order to that of a religious movement, who circulated propaganda around Iran, Syria, Asia Minor, and even as far as Sri Lanka. He amassed a substantial amount of political influence, and appointed his son Sadr al-Din Musa as his heir, which demonstrates that he was resolute on keeping his family in power.

Safi died on 12 September, 1334, where he was buried.

Lineage
Safi-ad-din was of Kurdish origins. According to Minorsky, Sheykh Safi al-Din's ancestor Firuz-Shah Zarrin-Kolah was a rich man, lived in Gilan and then Kurdish kings gave him Ardabil and its dependencies. Vladimir Minorsky refers to Sheykh Safi al-Din's claims tracing back his origins to Ali ibn Abu Talib, but expresses uncertainty about this.

The male lineage of the Safavid family given by the oldest manuscript of the Safwat as-Safa is:"(Shaykh) Safi al-Din Abul-Fatah Ishaaq the son of Al-Shaykh Amin al-din Jebrail the son of al-Saaleh Qutb al-Din Abu Bakr the son of Salaah al-Din Rashid the son of Muhammad al-Hafiz al-Kalaam Allah the son of Javaad the son of Pirooz al-Kurdi al-Sanjani (Piruz Shah Zarin Kolah the Kurd of Sanjan)" similar to the ancestry of Sheykh Safi al-Din's father-in-law, Sheikh Zahed Gilani, who also hailed from Sanjan, in Greater Khorasan.

Ascension as Murshid

Safi al-Din inherited Sheikh Zahed Gilani's  Sufi order, the "Zahediyeh", which he later transformed into his own, the "Safaviyya". Zahed Gilani also gave his daughter Bibi Fatemeh in wedlock to his favorite disciple. Safi al-Din, in turn, gave a daughter from a previous marriage in wedlock to Zahed Gilani's second-born son. Over the following 170 years, the Safaviyya Order gained political and military power, finally culminating in the foundation of the Safavid dynasty which established control over parts of Greater Iran and reasserted the Iranian identity of the region, thus becoming the first native dynasty since the Sasanian Empire to establish a national state officially known as Iran.

Poetry
Safi al-Din has composed poems in the Iranian dialect of Old Azeri. He was a seventh-generation descendant of Firuz-Shah Zarrin-Kolah, a local Iranian dignitary.
Eleven quatrains of Sheikh Safi ad-Din Ardabili, recorded by Pirzada, are listed under the title "Talysh poems of Razhi".
The Azeri language of the quatrains of Sheikh Sefi ad-Din was studied by B. V. Miller, who, in the course of his research, concluded that the dialect of the Ardebil people and the Ardabil region is the language of the ancestors of the modern Talysh, but already in the first half of the 14th century.
Only a very few verses of Safi al-Din's poetry, called Dobaytis (double verses), have survived. Written in Old Azeri language and Persian, they have linguistic importance today.

See also

 Ideology of Safavids
 Safavid dynasty family tree
 Sheikh Safi al-Din Khānegāh and Shrine Ensemble

Notes

References

Sources
 
 
 
 
 
 
 
 
 
 
 
 
 
 
 
  
 
 

Kurdish Sufis
Iranian Kurdish people
Safaviyeh order
Safavid dynasty
Iranian poets
Talysh poets
People from Ardabil
1252 births
1334 deaths
Kurdish scholars
Shafi'is
Ilkhanate-period poets
13th-century Kurdish people
14th-century Kurdish people